The Learjet 40 (LJ40) is a light business jet produced by Bombardier Aerospace.

Design and development

The Learjet 40 is derived from the Learjet 45, but with a shorter fuselage (by 24.5 inches/60 cm), and is powered by two Honeywell TFE731-20AR engines.  These are known as the "AR" engines. The 40 model takes the place of the discontinued Learjet 31a in the Learjet model line, with several performance and comfort improvements taken from the 45 model.

The prototype aircraft, a rebuilt Model 45, first flew on August 31, 2002, and the first production aircraft performed its maiden flight on September 5, 2002. Both flights took place from the Wichita Mid-Continent Airport. The LJ40 entered into service in January, 2004.

The Learjet 40XR is an upgraded version introduced in October, 2004, offering higher takeoff weights, faster cruise speeds and faster time-to-climb rates as compared to the LJ40. The increases are due to the upgrading of the engines to the TFE731-20BR configuration. These are the "BR" engines.  LJ40 owners can upgrade their aircraft through the incorporation of several service bulletins.

By 2018, Learjet 40XRs start at $2 million.

Specifications (Learjet 40)

See also

References

External links

 Bombardier Learjet website
 Year of Learjet website

40
2000s United States business aircraft
Twinjets
T-tail aircraft
Aircraft first flown in 2002